Rita Rato Araújo Fonseca (born 5 January 1983, in Estremoz) is a Portuguese politician, who was a member of the Assembly of the Republic from 2009 to 2019. She has a bachelor's degree in Political Science and International Relations from the New University of Lisbon and is a member of the Portuguese Communist Party.

In July 2020, Rato was appointed director of the Aljube museum. This is a former Estado Novo political prison that now serves as a museum in honour of those who opposed the regime. Since the announcement of the choice, several criticisms have arisen, referring to her lack of training in the area and of practical museological experience.

References

1983 births
People from Estremoz
Living people
Portuguese Communist Party politicians
Women members of the Assembly of the Republic (Portugal)
Members of the Assembly of the Republic (Portugal)
21st-century Portuguese women politicians
21st-century Portuguese politicians
NOVA University Lisbon alumni